Kierans is a surname. Notable people with the surname include:

Eric Kierans (1914–2004), Canadian economist and politician
Grainne Kierans (born 1978), Irish footballer and coach
Thomas Kierans (1913–2013), Canadian mining engineer